Rainsville is a city in DeKalb County, Alabama, United States. At the 2010 census the population was 4,948, up from 4,499 in 2000. Rainsville is located on top of Sand Mountain, a southern extension of the Cumberland Plateau.

History
Rainsville was incorporated in October 1956.

An EF5 tornado struck the city on April 27, 2011, leaving 25 fatalities. It initially touched down  to the southwest in Lakeview, causing structural damage to small buildings and snapping trees. It grew in intensity, and the path width increased from around fifty yards to a half a mile, as the rotation entered the Rainsville and Sylvania communities. Damage included houses that were completely removed from foundations and debris scattered for about one mile, trees debarked, and a few mobile homes were destroyed with debris strewn for about a mile downstream. In Sylvania, some of these houses removed from foundations contained anchor bolts and foundation straps.

Geography
Rainsville is located northwest of the center of DeKalb County at  (34.492258, -85.845316). It is bordered to the northeast by Sylvania, to the northwest by Powell, to the southwest by Shiloh, and to the southeast by Pine Ridge.

Alabama State Routes 35 and 75 intersect in the center of town. AL 35 leads northwest  to Scottsboro and southeast  to Fort Payne, the DeKalb County seat. AL 75 leads northeast  to Henagar and southwest  to Albertville.

Demographics

Rainsville first appeared on the 1960 U.S. Census, having incorporated as a town in 1956. It was erroneously reported as having 398 residents. This was due to an error which failed to include additional residents within the town limits, it was afterwards adjusted to 568 residents.

2020 census

As of the 2020 United States census, there were 5,505 people, 1,894 households, and 1,303 families residing in the city.

2010 census
As of the 2010 census Rainsville had a population of 4,984.  The racial and ethnic composition of the population was 93.5% non-Hispanic white, 0.2% African American, 0.9% Native American, 0.2% Asian, 0.1% Pacific Islander, 2.1% from some other race, 1.3% from two or more races and 3.8% Hispanic or Latino of any race.

2000 census
As of the census of 2000, there were 4,499 people, 1,880 households, and 1,336 families residing in the city. The racial makeup of the city was 97.11% White, 0.09% Black or African American, 0.44% Native American, 0.09% Asian, 0.09% Pacific Islander, 1.09% from other races, and 1.09% from two or more races. 2.18% of the population were Hispanic or Latino of any race.

There were 1,880 households, out of which 31.4% had children under the age of 18 living with them, 58.0% were married couples living together, 10.5% had a female householder with no husband present, and 28.9% were non-families. 26.9% of all households were made up of individuals, and 13.6% had someone living alone who was 65 years of age or older. The average household size was 2.39 and the average family size was 2.90.

In the city, the population was spread out, with 23.6% under the age of 18, 7.8% from 18 to 24, 28.1% from 25 to 44, 25.0% from 45 to 64, and 15.5% who were 65 years of age or older. The median age was 38 years. For every 100 females, there were 89.0 males. For every 100 females age 18 and over, there were 83.6 males.

The median income for a household in the city was $29,505, and the median income for a family was $37,426. Males had a median income of $31,776 versus $19,618 for females. The per capita income for the city was $14,806. About 11.9% of families and 14.4% of the population were below the poverty line, including 13.4% of those under age 18 and 18.3% of those age 65 or over.

Education
Plainview High School, home of the Bears, and the DeKalb County School System offices are located in Rainsville.

Cornerstone Christian Academy is located in Rainsville.

DeKalb County Technology Center, DCTC, Secondary Career Technical Education. DCTC is considered one of the top career technical education centers in the Southeastern United States, winning the Southern Regional Education Board's Pacesetter Award for excellence in career tech education in 2018 and 2020. In 2021, DCTC was recognized by Alabama Governor Kay Ivey for Best Practices in Work-Based Learning for Region 1. DCTC is home to 75 SkillsUSA and HOSA State Championships.

Notable people
 Lowell Barron, member of the Alabama Senate from 1982 to 2010
 Jeremy Pruitt, former head coach for the University of Tennessee football team 
 Nathaniel Ledbetter Alabama House of Representatives Majority Leader

References

External links

City of Rainsville official website

Cities in Alabama
Cities in DeKalb County, Alabama
Populated places established in 1956
1956 establishments in Alabama